Agustín Gabriel Bolívar (born 9 January 1996) is an Argentine professional footballer who plays as a midfielder for Club Almagro, on loan from Gimnasia La Plata.

Career
Bolívar was promoted into the senior squad of Gimnasia y Esgrima during the 2017–18 Argentine Primera División season. He was selected for his professional debut by manager Mariano Soso on 26 August 2017, with Bolívar being substituted on for the final ten minutes of a 4–4 draw away to Defensa y Justicia. Fourteen further appearances followed for Bolívar in his maiden season. Midway through 2019–20, Bolívar was loaned to Primera B Nacional's Guillermo Brown.

On 12 August 2020, Bolívar joined Club Atlético Atlanta on loan until the end of 2021. For the 2022 season, Bolívar was loaned out to Club Almagro.

Career statistics
.

References

External links

1996 births
Living people
Sportspeople from Buenos Aires Province
Argentine footballers
Association football midfielders
Argentine Primera División players
Primera Nacional players
Club de Gimnasia y Esgrima La Plata footballers
Guillermo Brown de Puerto Madryn footballers
Club Atlético Atlanta footballers
Club Almagro players